Sting may refer to:
 Stinger or sting, a structure of an animal to inject venom, or the injury produced by a stinger
 Irritating hairs or prickles of a stinging plant, or the plant itself

Fictional characters and entities
 Sting (Middle-earth), a fictional sword in J. R. R. Tolkien's The Hobbit and The Lord of the Rings
 Sting Oakley, a character in Gundam Seed Destiny
 Peter Stanchek (comics), a character nicknamed "Sting" in the Valiant Comics universe
 Trixie Sting, a character in the TV series Slugterra
 Kamen Rider Sting, a character in the TV series Kamen Rider Dragon Knight

Music
 Sting (EP), 2016, by Stellar
 "Sting" (Eric Saade song), 2015
 "Sting" (Fletcher song), 2022
 Sting (musical phrase), a short sequence of music used in films and TV as a form of punctuation
 Sting (percussion), a brief burst of percussion to punctuate a joke
 "Sting" (Stellar song), 2016

People
 Sting (musician) (born 1951), English musician and actor
 Sting (wrestler) (born 1959), American professional wrestler and actor
 Cheeseekau or Sting (1760–1792), war chief of the Kispoko division of the Shawnee Nation
 Sting International, stage name of American musician Shaun Pizzonia (born 1968)

Science
 Stimulator of interferon genes (STING), a protein
 Sting, a plant disease caused by Belonolaimus longicaudatus

Sports teams
 Arizona Sting, an NLL lacrosse team (2004–2007)
 Charlotte Sting, a WNBA basketball team (1997–2006)
 Chicago Sting, an American soccer team (1975–1988)
 Las Vegas Sting, now the Anaheim Piranhas, an Arena Football League team (1994–1995)
 Sarnia Sting, an Ontario Hockey League junior team
 Southern Sting, a New Zealand netball team (1998–2007)
 Trenton Sting, an Ontario Provincial Junior A Hockey League team

Video gaming
 Sting: The Secret Operations, a 2008 online first person shooter
 Sting Entertainment, a video game development company

Other uses
 Sting (fixture), a wind tunnel part
 Sting (horse) (born 1921), an American Thoroughbred racehorse
 Airborne Sting, a hang glider
 Sting Energy Drink, a Filipino/Pakistani energy drink
 Sting operation, a deceptive law enforcement operation to catch a person committing a crime

See also
 The Sting (disambiguation)